The Lower Helena Pipehead Dam, also known as the Lower Helena Pumpback Dam, catchment and pipeline are a part of the Goldfields Water Supply operations at Mundaring Weir, some distance east in the same valley, in the Darling Range in Western Australia.

The suburb Helena Valley is a few kilometres downstream of the dam.

The dam was first constructed in the early 1970s, on the Helena River at a location on the southern boundary of the suburb of Darlington, Western Australia.

By the 1980s and 1990s, the catchment and water quality saw a number of studies and reports.

Into the 2000s, further research continued, and the upper parts of the catchment area were being considered as restricted activity zones.

Notes

Helena River
Dams in Western Australia
Goldfields Water Supply Scheme